Olongapo Naval Base Perimeter National Park is a national park and protected area located in Zambales, Philippines. The park was established in 1968 and is approximately 0.09 square kilometers.

See also 

 List of national parks of the Philippines

References 

National parks of the Philippines
Protected areas established in 1968
1968 establishments in the Philippines
Geography of Zambales